Klein Kussewitz is a village and a former municipality  in the Rostock district, in Mecklenburg-Vorpommern, Germany. Since January 2018, it is part of the municipality Bentwisch.

References

Former municipalities in Mecklenburg-Western Pomerania